Nahuel Arroyo Mazorra (born 26 March 1995) is a Spanish footballer who plays mainly as a left winger for Córdoba CF.

Club career
Born in Santa Cristina d'Aro, Girona, Catalonia, Arroyo represented EF Gironès-Sàbat, EF Sant Feliu de Guíxols and Girona FC as a youth. He made his senior debut with the reserves during the 2014–15 season, in the regional leagues.

On 22 June 2017, Arroyo signed for Palamós CF in Tercera División. The following May, after being a regular starter, he moved to fellow league team UA Horta, and helped the latter club reach the play-offs.

On 25 June 2019, Arroyo agreed to a deal with Segunda División B newcomers UE Llagostera. On 5 October, he scored a brace in a 3–0 away win against Orihuela CF.

On 5 August 2020, Arroyo signed a three-year deal with Albacete Balompié in Segunda División. He made his professional debut on 22 October, coming on as a late substitute for Álvaro Peña in a 0–0 away draw against RCD Mallorca.

On 1 February 2021, Arroyo agreed to a two-and-a-half-year contract with Córdoba CF in the third division, after terminating his link with Alba.

References

External links

1996 births
Living people
People from Baix Empordà
Sportspeople from the Province of Girona
Spanish footballers
Footballers from Catalonia
Association football wingers
Segunda División players
Segunda División B players
Tercera División players
Girona FC B players
Palamós CF footballers
UA Horta players
UE Costa Brava players
Albacete Balompié players
Córdoba CF players